Dennis King (born September 24, 1952) is an American art curator and author who writes about vintage rock music posters, related memorabilia, and sports cards.  He was a major contributor and technical advisor to The Art of Rock by Paul Grushkin, which was released in 1987, and has become the standard reference book on rock posters of the 1960s and 1970s.  Grushkin and King co-authored the follow-up book, The Art of Modern Rock: The Poster Explosion in 2004, on which King was Art Director. More than 1,800 posters were reproduced in The Art of Modern Rock: The Poster Explosion, which detailed the resurgence and expansion of the art form's phenomenon, its style, and influence.  The book also featured a discussion of the history of silk-screening and its commercial applications following its industrialization, featuring the work of artists like Frank Kozik, Uncle Charlie, Art Chantry, and Yee Haw Industries.  The French edition, L’Art du Rock, was released in 2005.  King was the sole author on a pair of follow-up books, Art of Rock Mini #1: A-Z (2007) and Art of Rock Mini #2: Poster Girls (2008), both of which included new material and were published in smaller, more economical and accessible formats. He also wrote the epilogue to the 2008 book The Hammer of God: The Art of Malleus Rock Art Lab, a volume dedicated to the art collective consisting of three Italian poster artists whose work appeared in all three of the Art of Modern Rock books..

Writer
In addition to contributing to the Art of Modern Rock series, King has also written for Juxtapoz, interviewing poster artist Derek Hess, and about Japanese pop culture memorabilia for The Antiquer.  In 1991, he wrote for and published Japanese Baseball Card Quarterly. He published the first and only issue of The Rock Poster Collector, an attempt to promote and provide a resource for collecting rock posters and which included an article by John Lyons.  This attempt to organize the collecting community was followed soon after by the creation of The Rock Poster Society (TRPS).

Collector
King curated the "Art of Modern Rock: The Poster Explosion” exhibit which was shown at the Bumbershoot Multi-Disciplinary Arts Festival in Seattle and then at the Experience Music Project museum in Seattle in May 2006.  The show featured the work of more than 300 artists from King's personal collection. He provided images for the Art of Modern Rock wall calendars in 2008 and 2009.

King was interviewed about baseball cards for California Business in 1991, helped found the Sports Collectibles Association International, which promoted ethics in the sports collectibles industry. He has also been a member of the Ephemera Society of America.

Collectibles dealer
King began to collect rock posters and other memorabilia as a teenager in the early 1960s and started selling them in 1971 at a flea market in Alameda, California and other outlets. After paying his way through school by dealing in collectible sports cards, comic books, poster art, and related ephemera, he was graduated from UC Berkeley with a degree in Mathematics, After a brief spell teaching high school, he decided to deal in collectible memorabilia full-time, opening his first dedicated brick and mortar retail store front, King's Baseball Cards and Comic Books, in the Durant Mall in the Telegraph Avenue area of Berkeley, California. In 1982, he relocated the store to Center Street in the center of downtown Berkeley where he expanded his offerings and became one of the first shops to offer authentic MLB teamwear to the public.

He opened D. King Gallery in Berkeley in 1996, at first focusing on art exhibitions. but eventually returning the focus to 1960s rock posters and vintage sports memorabilia.  He has maintained an online store since 1997.  Additionally, he owns the adjunct King's Comics, which deals in vintage comic books and related merchandise.

References

Album-cover and concert-poster artists
American writers
Comics retailers
Businesspeople from Berkeley, California
American poster artists
1952 births
Living people